Metland Telagamurni Station (MTM) is a class III railway station located in Telagamurni, West Cikarang, Bekasi Regency. The station, which is located at an altitude of +18 meters, is included in the Operational Area I Jakarta of Kereta Api Indonesia and only serves the KRL Commuterline. The station has two railway tracks.

Located nearby Metland Cibitung housing complex, Metland Telagamurni Station is a public-private-partnership between Directorate General of Railways of Ministry of Transportation, Kereta Api Indonesia, property company Metland, and contractor PT Majumapan Bangunindo. In a roadmap designed by those parties, the station was built to be used by Metland Cibitung residents to catch public transport without the need to go to nearby Cikarang Station.

History 
The location of this station is not far from the Metland housing complex. Even in the roadmap made by the developer company, Metland (PT. Metropolitan Land Tbk) and the contractor, PT Majumapan Bangunindo together with the Directorate General of Railways and PT KAI, this station will be used by residents of the Metland area so they can use rail transportation services without  need to go to Cikarang Station. The groundbreaking for the station took place on 8 August 2016.

This station was opened on 18 May 2019 as a first step to trial KRL Commuterline services at this station. Along with the satisfactory evaluation results for approximately three months, this station was finally inaugurated on 13 August 2019 by the Minister of Transportation, Budi Karya Sumadi.

Building and layout 
This station only have two railway tracks.

Services
The following is a list of train services at the Metland Telagamurni Station.

Passenger services 
 KAI Commuter
  Cikarang Loop Line (Full Racket)
  Cikarang Loop Line (Half Racket), to / (via  and ) and

References

External links

Bekasi Regency
Railway stations in West Java
Railway stations opened in 2019
2019 establishments in Indonesia